Khetri Nagar is the town in Jhunjhunu district of Rajasthan in India. It is a part of the Shekhawati region. Khetri consists of two towns, "Khetri Town" founded by Raja Khet Singhji Nirwan and "Khetri Nagar" which is about 10 km away from Khetri. Khetri Nagar, well known for its Copper Project, was built by and is under the control of Hindustan Copper Limited, a public sector undertaking under the Government of India. Khetri Nagar is also known as 'Copper'. There are many attached villages near Khetri Nagar like Manota Khurd, the people of this village was employed in mines. Khetri is full of heritage and diversity. People of various religions live with mutual cooperation and harmony here. Today this adorable part of India is the backward region due to lack of development. Khetri is the town and Tehsil in Jhunjhunu district of Rajasthan state in India. Total number of villages in this Tehsil is 106. Khetri Tehsil sex ratio is 914 females per 1000 of males. Average literacy rate of Khetri Tehsil in 2011 were 72.51%, in which male and female literacy were 85.58% and 58.39% respectively.

Geography 
It has an average elevation of 484 metres (1587 feet).
The name of the mountain in Khetri is Bhopalgarh.

Demographics 
 India census, Khetri had a population of 17,377. Males constitute 52% of the population and females 48%. Khetri has an average literacy rate of 67%, higher than the national average of 59.5%: male literacy is 77%, and female literacy is 56%. In Khetri, 15% of the population is under 6 years of age.

Khetri fort 
Khetri fort was built in 1754 by the Shekhawat raja, Bhopal Singh (Raja Shri Bhopal Singh Shekhawat Ji Saheb Bahadur).

References

External links 
 Genealogy of Khetri Rulers

Khetri mines owned by the Hindustan copper Ltd. This mine was started over 2000 years ago. Khetri copper complex mines Rajasthan India. The region is highly contaminated by copper with higher values in the soil near overburden material and tailings.

Cities and towns in Jhunjhunu district
Copper mines in India
Mining in Rajasthan